Zuni Pueblo (also Zuñi Pueblo, Zuni: Halona Idiwan’a meaning ‘Middle Place’) is a census-designated place (CDP) in McKinley County, New Mexico, United States. The population was 6,302 as of the 2010 Census.  It is inhabited largely by members of the Zuni people (A:shiwi).

The first contact with Spaniards occurred in 1539 in the ancient village of Hawikku when Esteban, an Arab/Berber of Moroccan origin, entered Zuni territory seeking the fabled "Seven Cities of Cibola" and when Marco da Nizza, an Italian franciscan, reached Zuni Pueblo and called it Cibola.

It is on the Trails of the Ancients Byway, one of the designated New Mexico Scenic Byways.

Geography
Zuni Pueblo is located at  (35.069327, -108.846716).

Demographics

As of the census of 2000, there were 6,367 people, 1,488 households, and 1,334 families residing in the CDP. The population density was 720.0 people per square mile (278.1/km). There were 1,622 housing units at an average density of 183.4 per square mile (70.8/km). The racial makeup of the CDP was 97.03% Native American, 2.12% White, 2.01% Hispanic or Latino, 0.03% African American, 0.03% Asian, 0.30% from other races, and 0.49% from two or more races.

There were 1,488 households, out of which 42.1% had children under the age of 18 living with them, 51.1% were married couples living together, 31.7% had a female householder with no husband present, and 10.3% were non-families. 9.0% of all households were made up of individuals, and 1.5% had someone living alone who was 65 years of age or older. The average household size was 4.26 and the average family size was 4.54.

In the CDP, the population was spread out, with 34.7% under the age of 18, 9.8% from 18 to 24, 32.3% from 25 to 44, 16.8% from 45 to 64, and 6.3% who were 65 years of age or older. The median age was 29 years. For every 100 females, there were 92.7 males. For every 100 females age 18 and over, there were 89.2 males.

The median income for a household in the CDP was $22,559, and the median income for a family was $22,067. Males had a median income of $18,345 versus $18,635 for females. The per capita income for the CDP was $6,908. About 40.0% of families and 43.0% of the population were below the poverty line, including 49.7% of those under age 18 and 41.7% of those age 65 or over.

Transport
The area is served by the nearby Andrew Othole Airport, four miles to the west.

Tribally-run A:shiwi Transit connects Zuni Pueblo and Black Rock with Gallup.

Education
Zuni Public Schools, established in 1980, operates schools serving the community. Prior to 1980 it was in the Gallup-McKinley County Schools. Zuni High School is the zoned high school.

St. Anthony School, Zuni (K-8), of the Roman Catholic Diocese of Gallup, is in Zuni Pueblo. The school began operations on September 3, 1923. The Sisters of Saint Francis of Perpetual Adoration operated the school. Its initial enrollment was 43.

The Zuni Public Library is located at 27 East Chavez Circle. In 1974, Dr. Lotsee Patterson and Ben Wakashige started a project to help tribal areas establish libraries. The Zuni library opened in 1975.

See also

 List of census-designated places in New Mexico
 Zuni Indian Reservation
 Zuni people

References

External links

 Pueblo of the Zuni - official site
 Zuni Department of Tourism
 Historic photos of Zuni Pueblo, Timothy H. O'Sullivan, photographer
 American Southwest, a National Park Service Discover Our Shared Heritage Travel Itinerary

Pueblo
Census-designated places in New Mexico
Census-designated places in McKinley County, New Mexico
Native American history of New Mexico
Pueblo great houses